is a live-action TV drama adaptation of Grave of the Fireflies, made by NTV in Japan. It was produced in commemoration of the 60th anniversary of the end of World War II. The drama aired on November 1, 2005. Like the anime, the live-action version of Grave of the Fireflies focuses on two siblings, Seita and Setsuko, struggling to survive the final days of the war in Kobe, Japan. Unlike the animated version, however, it tells the story from the point of view of their cousin (their aunt's daughter) and also deals with the issue of how the war-time environment could change a kind lady into a hard-hearted woman. The film stars Nanako Matsushima as the aunt and Mao Inoue as the cousin (who also portrays the cousin's granddaughter).

Plot
The film is something of an epilogue, set in 2005, 60 years after the Second World War ended. It opens at a crematorium in Kobe, Japan, where a family is paying their respects to Hisako Sawano (Seita and Setsuko's aunt), who has just passed away at the age of 95. The funeral director comments how a person who lived through the Meiji, Taishō, Shōwa, and Heisei periods has finally gone to rest. After the funeral, Natsu (Seita's and Setsuko's cousin), Hisako's eldest of four children who is now a grandmother herself, sorts through her mother's belongings with her teenage granddaughter, Keiko. Keiko unexpectedly finds the metal fruit-drop tin and asks why it is important. Natsu begins to tell her about the family's struggle to survive during the Second World War, and the emotional scars that it left.

Just prior to Seita's death in September 1945, someone informed Hisako and Natsu that he was still alive, though with no sign of his sister Setsuko and living near the central railway station in Kobe. Hisako and Natsu go to the station in hope of finding Seita, but cannot. Natsu asks a janitor if he saw "a third-year middle-school student, Seita Yokokawa, from Kobe 1st Middle School", wearing a school cap and with his little sister. This triggers another janitor's memory and he recalls that the previous night, the two of them had found a dead boy matching Seita's description in a corner of the station. While carrying his corpse to be cremated, a metal fruit-drop tin fell from his clothes and thinking it rubbish, the janitor tossed it into a field.

Hisako locates the tin; while Natsu looks on, she opens it and tips two small bits of white bone into her palm – Setsuko's. Hisako falls silent, while Natsu, who understands what happened to her cousins, blames her mother for causing their deaths and walks away, crying. After she leaves, Hisako notices two small, glowing fireflies under the tin. While watching them fly away, Hisako tearfully whispers a soft thanks, knowing she has been forgiven.

It is the 18th year of Shōwa – 1943. Seita's father, a Captain in the Imperial Navy, privately reveals to him that the war is going badly for Japan, telling him that he must now look after his mother and sister as he will soon be deployed, and that he is willing to die in the Emperor's service. Seita gives his father his assurance, and his father promises that Japan will win the war despite the current situation. Meanwhile, Seita's uncle, Genzo Sawano, a carpenter, has been drafted into the army shortly after his family has relocated to Kobe. Hisako and Natsu are worried about his departure, but try to be optimistic for Hana, Yuki, and Teizō.

After the departure of both husbands, Hisako and Kyoko bump into each other. The families spend the day together and Hisako gives Setsuko a tin with candy fruits. Hisako and Kyoko agree to try to help each other out while both their husbands are away.

As time progresses, an ever-increasing number of people are forced to deal with bombing raids and worsening shortages of food. On the day of the Kobe city firebombings, Seita is burying food in his yard. Kyoko leaves to go to the bomb shelter as Seita and Setsuko soon follow. Both Seita and Setsuko are caught in the middle of the bombing but escape unharmed, though Setsuko loses one of her sandals. After the bombings, they go to a school where doctors are giving medical attention to those hurt. As they arrive at the school, Hisako meets both of them outside and says that Kyoko was injured. He goes to see her while Hisako watches Setsuko. Inside, Seita finds his mother wrapped in bandages, the doctor says one of the bombs got into the shelter and went off. She dies soon after.

Hisako takes Setsuko home with her while Seita stays for the evening. He is given an urn with his mother's ashes in it. He returns to Hisako's house where he says that he will now be responsible for taking care of Setsuko, even though Hisako thinks he should go to school and she will watch Setsuko. Seita writes his father and tells him about the death of his mother and that he and Setsuko and staying with their aunt. He gives Setsuko their mother's jade ring, which Setsuko treasures, and wears on a necklace.

As food rations are dropping, Hisako starts to worry about how she will feed her children, nephew and niece. She then sells her kimono for money and is chastised for taking in two other children and how they do not help in a time of war. As she is walking home, Hisako learns that her husband was killed in action in a banzai charge. As she and her children grieve over his death, Seita assures Hisako that she should feel happy since his death has meaning; Hisako does not take this lightly. At night, Teizō begins suffering from asthma; Setsuko starts crying and refusing to go to sleep. Hisako then leaves to try to find a doctor.

The next day as they are eating, Seita and Setsuko are only served soup with no rice; they continue to get served very little while Hisako's children get plenty. During another bombing, Seita and Setsuko take refuge in an abandoned bomb shelter. Seeing the explosion from a distance, it reminds them of a fireworks show they saw some years ago. Hisako gets on to Seita about leaving on his own during the bombing and how he should start to help by letting Hisako sell his mother's jade ring for rice; Seita is hesitant at first but gives in, which angers Setsuko. Hisako agrees to give them rice that night for dinner.

Hisako continues to feed Seita and Setsuko very little, even making them start to provide for their own water. Natsu chastises her mother for how she is treating them but Hisako ignores her. Seita and Setsuko eventually leave and go to live in the bomb shelter. While their cousins protest, Hisako remains silent.

While at the shelter, Seita entertains Setsuko by catching and releasing fireflies inside. The following morning when she buries them, Setsuko tells Seita that she knows their mother was killed. Seita assures Setsuko that Japan will win the war and their father will return to them.

Meanwhile, Hisako's brother-in-law, Yoshie, gives her some money and leaves her home. Seita and Setsuko begin to starve and Seita resorts to stealing food from a farmer; Natsu witnesses this and is shocked; when the farmer catches Seita and asks if she knows him, Natsu makes no comment and Seita leaves in shock with Setsuko. Setsuko becomes ill and when she is taken to the hospital, the doctor does very little to help.

During another bombing, Seita breaks into a shop and steals food but is caught, beaten up by the store owner, taken to the police. After the bombing, Hisako comes to get Seita and is warned that if he does it again, she will be held responsible. As they are walking, Seita tries to explain his actions but Hisako tells him that she cannot feed them properly. Seita then runs away in anger back to the shelter where he breaks down into tears and Setsuko comforts him.

The following morning, Setsuko is trying to eat marbles, thinking they are fruit drops. Seita decides use the remaining money he has to buy her food. Meanwhile, an announcement is made by the emperor about the unconditional surrender of Japan, which Hisako and her children hear over the radio; Hana, Yuki, and Teizō are relieved the war is over while Natsu is shocked that they lost and Hisako simply goes to cook breakfast. Seita hears the news on the streets from a group of returning soldiers. He also learns that the imperial fleet was wiped out as well, meaning his father has died. Seita breaks down in grief, whereupon he is found by Yoshie. Yoshie tries to talk to Seita but he runs off. Yoshie later meets with Hisako and explains he plans to return to Tokyo. He also reveals his encounter with Seita, which Natsu overhears.

Seita returns to the shop, where the owners initially throw him out but he begs them to sell him food. Seita returns to the shelter to cook some food, only to find out that Setsuko has died, much to his devastation. Meanwhile, Natsu and Hisako go to find Seita and Setsuko now that the war is over. They locate the bomb shelter and are shocked to see how Seita and Setsuko had been living. Natsu and Hisako continue searching for the siblings but are unsuccessful. Meanwhile, Seita takes Setsuko's body to the top of a hill, where he cremates her in a straw casket. During the cremation, fireflies arrive in the night. Seita then takes some of his sister's bones and places them in the fruit-drop tin. After this, he goes to the railway station in Kobe, and dies.

Following this flashback, both Natsu and Hisako leave the station. Natsu goes to the bridge where her family saw fireflies the first time. She feels guilty and unable to live with happened to Seita and Setsuko. Hisako slaps her, warning Natsu that the real war has begun and dying means losing before embracing her daughter as she cries. Later, Hisako and her children moved back to Tokyo and a law was passed in Japan to protect orphans affected by war. Hisako never again mentioned the war until her death.

In the present day, Natsu and Keiko are on the same bridge she was on years ago. Natsu reflects on how the war changed everyone as she and Keiko discuss its impact on their family history. As Keiko watches on, Natsu takes out Setsuko's remains and throws them into the river. Two fireflies then fly away, symbolizing Seita and Setsuko.

After the closing scene while the movie's credits roll, images of children affected by military violence and occupation are shown. These images are interspersed with images of Seita and Setsuko. The modern-day images seem to be of Palestinian children, including one girl smiling as she displays a photo of Yasser Arafat.

Reaction

Commenting on the dramatization, Akiyuki Nosaka noted that the drama was liberal in deviating from his original work but also said that he would nevertheless remain thankful if it could convey the brutality of wars to the people of the present days.

Cast
 Mao Inoue (young woman) as : As a 16-year-old, Natsu is Hisako's eldest daughter and Seita and Setsuko's cousin. She forms a relationship with Seita and protests how Hisako treats Seita and Setsuko.
 Keiko Kishi (old woman) as : As a 76-year-old, Natsu remembers the old days and tells the story to her granddaughter.
 Mao Inoue as : Keiko is Natsu's granddaughter and Hisako's great-granddaughter, who listens intently as Natsu recounts her experiences during the war.
 Nanako Matsushima as : 35-year-old Hisako is Seita and Setsuko's aunt
 Tsuyoshi Ihara as : 39-year-old Genzō is Hisako's husband and Natsu's father.
 Jun Kaname as : Yoshie is Genzō's brother, and Hisako's brother-in-law. Because he has a bad leg, he was not called into service.
 Mayuko Fukuda as : 12-year-old Hana is one of Hisako's daughters.
  as : 10-year-old Yuki is one of Hisako's daughters.
  as : 7-year-old Teizō is Hisako's only son. He suffers from asthma.
 Ikki Sawamura as : Kiyoshi is Seita and Setsuko's father and a colonel in the Japanese Navy.
 Yui Natsukawa as : Kyoko is Seita and Setsuko's mother. She has heart problems.
  as : 15-year-old Seita is the son of a Japanese naval commander.
  as : 5-year-old Setsuko is Seita's younger sister.

See also 
 Grave of the Fireflies

References

External links
 Grave of the Fireflies at Nippon Television 
 
 

2005 films
2005 television films
Anti-war films about World War II
Children and death
Nippon TV films
Films set in 1943
Films set in 1945
Films set in 2005
Films set in Kobe
Japanese war drama films
2000s Japanese-language films
Pacific War films
Films with screenplays by Yumiko Inoue
Cultural depictions of Yasser Arafat
Japanese World War II films
Films based on short fiction
Films about siblings
2000s Japanese films